Bashkiria may refer to:
Republic of Bashkortostan, a federal subject of Russia
Bashkir Autonomous Soviet Socialist Republic (1919–1992), an administrative division of the Russian SFSR, Soviet Union
Bashkiria (brachiopod), a genus of Brachiopoda; see List of brachiopod genera
Badzhgard or Bashkiria, a historical and geographical area in Volga and Ural
Bashkiria (1917–1919), an autonomous and de facto independent state which existed during the Russian Civil War

See also
Bashkir (disambiguation)

vi:Bashkiria